The 1988–89 North Carolina Tar Heels men's basketball team represented the University of North Carolina from Chapel Hill, North Carolina.

Led by head coach Dean Smith, the Tar Heels completed yet another in a long line of impressive seasons, with 29 wins, a top ten ranking, and a Sweet 16 appearance in the NCAA tournament.

Roster

Schedule and results

|-
!colspan=9 style=| Regular Season

|-
!colspan=9 style=| ACC Tournament

|-
!colspan=9 style=| NCAA tournament

Rankings

NBA draft

References

North Carolina Tar Heels men's basketball seasons
North Carolina
Tar
Tar
North Carolina